Ryan Roxie (born Ryan Rosowicz, December 1, 1965) is an American guitarist, singer/songwriter best known as a solo artist and for playing guitar with Alice Cooper, Casablanca, Gilby Clarke, and Slash's Snakepit. Roxie is the primary founder of the System-12 Guitar Method and also hosts the weekly In the Trenches with Ryan Roxie podcast.

Early Years 

Roxie was born in Sacramento, California and grew up in the East Bay in Pleasanton. Roxie's father, Polish, was a trumpet player and his mother was a drummer in her high school marching band. When he was about the age of five Roxie picked up the guitar but was more interested in drums. It wasn't until he was around eleven or twelve that he started taking guitar seriously.

Roxie learned to play guitar from an old record player and invented his own form of scratching, going through many records in the process, picking out guitar parts. He was influenced by albums like Van Halen and has had many guitar heroes including Brian May from Queen, Steve Stevens, Elliot Easton from The Cars as well as Neil Geraldo from Pat Benatar and Rick Nielsen of Cheap Trick.

Career

1977–1990: Candy & Electric Angels

Candy were a band featuring original members Kyle Vincent, Jonathan Daniel, John Schubert, and guitarist Geoff Siegel. Gilby Clarke replaced Siegel after six months. The album Whatever Happened To Fun was released in 1985. Later in the same year, Gilby Clarke replaced Kyle Vincent as lead vocalist, and Roxie joined the lineup on guitar. After Gilby left to form his own band "Kill for Thrills" the remaining band members joined up with new lead vocalist Shane and became the "Electric Angels".

The band then moved to New York where they were signed to Atlantic Records at a show opening for Dogs D'amour and Mother Love Bone (some of whose members went on to form Pearl Jam). Their self-titled album, produced by Tony Visconti (best known for his work with T Rex, Bowie and Thin Lizzy to name a few) was released in 1990 and the band toured with Danger Danger, Ace Frehley, and Icon. The band began work on a second album (tentatively called New York Times) but was dropped by Atlantic and the record was not released until 2017, then under the name "Lost in the Atlantic", a dig at Atlantic Records.

1991–2000: Alice Cooper, Gilby Clarke, Slash & DPM

Between 1994 and 1996 Roxie worked with various artists. He provided guitar on Gilby Clarke's albums, Pawnshop Guitars, Blooze, The Hangover and Rubber. Though uncredited Roxie also played guitar for Tal Bachman. Roxie played on the hit single "She's So High" produced by Bob Rock. Roxie played guitar on Inhale by James Michael (from Sixx AM). In 2000 Roxie also wrote and recorded several songs on Slash's Snakepit's second album Ain't Life Grand.

Roxie began working with Alice Cooper in 1996; after a recommendation from Gilby Clarke, and a shady character known as 'Bobby from Mates', Roxie impressed during an audition. He was offered a 'one year tour' playing with Cooper. His first show with the Cooper band was at Sammy Hagar's Cabo Wabo club in Cabo San Lucas.

In 1997 Roxie joined up with long-time friends drummer Mike Fasano and bassist Will Effertz to create the band Dad's Porno Mag. After Effertz left, guitarist Keri Kelli and bassist Stefan Adika joined. Their album, produced by Jim Mitchell (Ugly Kid Joe) and Mark Schulman (Simple Minds), with additional production by Alex Woltman and friend Gilby Clarke, was released on Wax-Tone Records; the album went out of print but was later re-released in 2000 from Robinson Records.

In 1999, Roxie formed GlamNation under the alias Peter Kensington; the band was a glam-rock cover band that played covers of early glam bands such as The Sweet, David Bowie, Queen, T.Rex and Gary Glitter. The band played a number of shows in L.A. in 1999 and had a regular spot at The Gig (Club American Style) and a show in Scandinavia in 2000.   The band at various times consisted of the following musicians playing under their GlamNation Aliases, Ryan Roxie ("Peter Kensington), guitars; Eric Singer ("Doyle Harris"), drums and vocals; Eric Dover ("J.C. Jackson"), vocals and guitars; Stefan Adika ("Yashiya"), bass; Derek Sherinian ("Ricky Lemons"), keyboards. In 2000 Teddy Andreadis ("Dr. Midnight") replaced Derek Sherinian on keyboards. In 2000 Roxie recorded his first studio album with Alice Cooper, Brutal Planet, and except for Stefan Adika the other members of GlamNation played in the band Alice Cooper used on the Brutal Planet Tour. Later without Teddy Andreadis, Roxie and GlamNation went on to co-write and record the 2003 Alice Cooper release The Eyes of Alice Cooper.

2000–2009: Alice Cooper, Roxie77 & Happypill

Through 2000 to 2005 Roxie collaborated with Cooper on several albums including Dragontown, The Eyes of Alice Cooper and Dirty Diamonds, co-writing a number of songs on the latter two albums.

In 2002 Roxie formed Roxie 77 and wrote a song whose influences lie somewhere in between the Beatles and the Beastie Boys.  Roxie 77's 11-song debut album, Peace, Love & Armageddon, was released under the small indie Wax-Tone Records label in 2004. The songs span from talking about acting like a punk kid to facing the reality of actually having a child. Roxie 77's second album Two Sides to Every Story, was released in July 2009. The band added a downloadable song every week, with 24 songs in all (each song in a full band and acoustic version).

On July 7, 2005, Roxie aired the first Roxie 77 podcast – Roxie's Big Rock Show. There were seven podcasts which featured interviews with long-time friend Stefan Adika, as well as Calico Cooper, Damon Johnson, Eric Singer, Alice Cooper. Cheap Trick's Rick Nielsen and Bun E. Carlos were also interviewed. The podcast also played Roxie's favourite songs, some rare tracks and two unreleased Roxie tracks including "Consequence Of The City" with ex-Alice Cooper band member and friend Eric Dover on vocals.

In October 2006 Roxie hosted his own radio show on Rocket 95.3 FM (The Rock Home of Stockholm)  The show ran weekly and featured a variety of music.  The website featured live streaming, an online chat and webcam of Roxie in the studio during broadcasts.

2010–2021: Solo career, Alice Cooper, Casablanca & TED

From 2010 through to 2014, Roxie recorded two albums with the Stockholm-based, Casablanca: Apocalyptic Youth and Riding a Black Swan.

In March 2012 it was announced that Ryan Roxie was rejoining the Alice Cooper band for the forthcoming 2012 tour, joining Tommy Henriksen and Orianthi on guitar, Chuck Garric on bass and Glen Sobel on drums.

In 2014, Roxie 77 released a six-song EP, The Ameriswede. The record was rather a unique release, with one "American side", mixed by Tommy Henriksen, and one "Swedish side", mixed by Jon Bordon with a more garage-indie sound.

Late in 2017, while on the road with Alice Cooper, Roxie released a new solo single, a cover of The Move's "California Man" featuring guest vocals from Robin Zander of Cheap Trick (who had covered the same song on their Heaven Tonight record).

Roxie continued touring with Alice Cooper though 2018, and also released two new solo singles the first "Over & Done" in March followed by "To Live and Die in L.A." in May.

Roxie's first official solo album "Imagine Your Reality" was released May 25, 2018, and followed by a U.S. Tour billed as the "Planet Axe Tour".  Five singles were released from the record, and the band toured the U.K. in 2019.

Roxie participated in TEDxStockholm Wonderland in 2019; Ryan was praised for his entertaining segment (particularly as it was on short notice with very little preparation). He played a number of songs and spoke in between;  he went on to state that his success was based on the ‘’three P’s practice": Practice, Persistence and Patience, work towards a goal and it will happen. Ironically after seeing his first TEDTalk some years before, it had become a goal of Ryan's to one day deliver a TEDTalk himself...

December 2018 Ryan Roxie is announced as a Headline act for "The Cancer on the Rocks Macmillan Benefit Fundraiser 2019" to be held on the 23 and 24 February in Cheshire.

December 2018 Ryan Roxie releases the 6th single "Big Rock Show" from "Imagine your Reality" the song guests his bandmates from the current Alice Cooper band Glen Sobel on drums and Tommy Henriksen on bass. The lyric video was filmed on an iPhone XR designed for viewing in portrait mode on smartphones and tablets. On the day of the single release Ryan had the unique idea to stream a LIVE guitar lesson on how to play the song with help from his friends at PlayAlong Music. The idea was a success with viewers able to ask Ryan questions live via Facebook or Instagram through the duration of the stream.

December 31, 2018 Ryan Roxie reforms with GlamNation to perform at Rava Wines in Paso Robles, California with the original GlamNation (2000) line up and special guests Brent Woods, Sebastian Bach, FIFI LaRUE, Jesse Adika, Kenny Lee Lewis, and Brett Scallions.

January 2019 Ryan Roxie announces first solo show of 2019 for February 2 Thessaloniki, Greece.

January 2019 New Official Ryan Roxie Website released

January 2019 following the popularity of the Big Rock Show single release live guitar lesson, Ryan continues to take requests from fans of songs they would like to learn and every few weeks broadcasts a new lesson including Ryan's track "Me Generation", Alice Coopers "Brutal Planet" and Cheap Tricks "Surrender".

February 2019 Ryan Roxie is announced as a guest on the 2019 Bandit Rock Awards and performs songs from Imagine Your Reality.

February 2019 Ryan Roxie announces an April 2019 U.S. Planet Axe Tour with Brandon Gibbs, Joel Kosche, Robby Miller, and Kenny Bailey in addition to a busy schedule with Alice Cooper on the "Old Black Eyes is Back" 2019 Tour

March 2019 Ryan Roxie to appear at the Crow Club in Athens Greece with Alice Cooper tribute band Snakebite, the show is billed as "Ryan Roxie of the Alice Cooper Band meets Snakebite the Alice Cooper Tribute Band"

April 2019 Ryan Roxie tours the U.S. with Brandon Gibbs, Joel Kosche, Robby Miller, Kenny Bailey, and Jacob Cade for the Planet Axe 2.0 Tour

April 12, 2019 Ryan Roxie releases his 7th single "Look Me In The Eye" from "Imagine your Reality". The video is directed by Gustav Kronfelt & filmed by Anton Körberg and, in true Roxie style, includes hidden messages throughout the video which Ryan uses to run competitions on social media.

April 23, 2019 Ryan Roxie (known for his huge presence on social media) posts his 1000th Facebook post

May 2019 Ryan Roxie to again join Alice Cooper on the "Old Black Eyes" Tour through the U.S and Europe beginning on May 4 at the Domination Festival, Mexico and finishing at the Motorpoint Arena Cardiff in the UK on October 12.

May 18, 2019 Ryan Roxie returns to Rava Wines in Paso Robles CA for a special performance with "The Sunset Winos", the all-star band also featured Eric Dover, Stefan Adika, Teddy Andreadis, Johnny Griparic, Jimmy DeGrasso, Slim Jim Phantom, and Paul Black.

June 8, 2019 Ryan Roxie plays with Blue Coupe at the Sweden Rock Festival. Blue Coupe features Dennis Dunaway (bass player and founding member of the original Alice Cooper Group), as well as Joe Bouchard and Albert Bouchard original founders of Blue Öyster Cult.

July 7, 2019 (7/7 Roxie day) Ryan Roxie releases a special edition of Ryan Roxie's Imagine Your Reality through Bellyache Records, known as the ‘Alternate Reality - Purple Skull’ Special Edition LP. The record is pressed on ‘Translucent Purple’ vinyl in honour of Purple Skull Music, the studio in Stockholm Sweden where the bulk of the album was recorded. To mark its exclusivity each copy is hand-numbered and only 85 copies were pressed.

July 16, 2019 Ryan Roxie debuts "In the Trenches with Ryan Roxie" a new podcast series promoted as a show that features in depth conversations with the world's hardest working musicians...the ones that grind, the ones that commit, the ones who make their dreams come true...in the trenches. Some of the featured interviewed artists include Phil X, Steve Stevens, Joe Satriani and Desmond Child.

July 2019 Ryan Roxie joins the Alice Cooper band for the "Alice Cooper-O’l Black Eyes Is Back Tour " in early July and "Alice Cooper/Halestorm Motionless in White Summer Tour 2019 " (a double headline tour which runs through from mid-July to mid-August) before returning to the Alice Cooper-O’l Black Eyes Is Back Tour which will visit UK, North America, Australia, New Zealand and Europe’

August 20, 2019 Ryan Roxie appears on the Pink Carpet At the ‘Live from the Astroturf w/ Alice Cooper" premiere event in NYC.

September 2019 Ryan Roxie announces he will be joining supergroup Lost Angels for the "Good to the Last Drop UK Tour" for a series of shows beginning on the 17th October in Grimsby with Troy Patrick Farrell, EJ Curse and his old Alice Cooper/Glamnation bandmate Eric Dover.

October 16, 2019 Ryan Roxie Releases the first of three lyric videos for ‘Nevermind Me' from the Ryan Roxie solo album 'Imagine Your Reality'. In true Roxie style access to versions two and three of the ‘Nevermind Me' video you must follow the hidden clues within the preceding video to work out the links…
November 28, 2019, Ryan Roxie is a guest on Couch Riffs with Mike Squires. The concept of the show being Mike gives the artist a list of songs to choose from, builds the drum track to record on it...however, you only get one opportunity to record the entire song from start to finish. The chosen song was Cheap Tricks 'He's a Whore' which was just about perfect...

December 26, 2019, Ryan Roxie begins... The 12 Days of 'Pickmas' and continues to release a new pick each day on social media for the following twelve days allowing fans to get a glimpse of the upcoming 2020 guitar pick range with varying themes.

January 13, 2020, leading into the upcoming 2020 Australian Tour it is announced Ryan Roxie will join Alice Cooper at a fundraising concert at the ANZ Stadium in Sydney, Australia, billed as Fire Fight Australia on the Sunday 16 February 2020 playing alongside multiple international and local acts including other headliners Queen + Adam Lambert, Olivia Newton-John and k.d. lang to raise funds for the 2019–20 Australian Bushfire Crisis. The concert sold out in about 5 hours selling in excess of 65,000 tickets.

March 2020, Roxie released a special “live stream edition” of "In the Trenches with Ryan Roxie" Episode #7009 Podcast featuring Alice Cooper bandmate and Hollywood Vampire Tommy Henriksen. The live stream version is well received and is used occasionally from this point on allowing fans to interact with Ryan and his guests.

On March 24, 2020, Roxie debuted "Sunday Livestream Sunday" a live stream show where Roxie performed some songs acoustically, general chit chat and news. Most importantly, he used the platform to launch his new online guitar lesson platform the System-12 Guitar Method.

On March 24, 2020, Roxie launched his new System-12 Guitar Method, The online guitar lesson platform was received well by both the public and fans alike, Guitar International Online magazine releases an interview with Ryan and promotes the release. Popular website Blabbermouth also take interest and release a story on the project.

On April 14, 2020, Roxie was interviewed by Metaltalk.net and spoke about, lockdown, guitar lesson, Alice Cooper, Slash, Motely Crue and much more.
June 14, 2020 sees the release of “Heart's in Trouble” the 9th single from 'Imagine Your Reality'.
On October 16, 2020, Roxie appeared in promotional video testing Aloha by Elk product, the platform essentially lets the user connect over internet and play together like they are in the same room in real time.

On November 29, Roxie was a special guest on Talkulture with kid cadet and Danica Jenelle a Live Q&A

On January 1, 2021, Roxie released “The Uh-Oh Song”. the 10th and final video release for the ‘Imagine Your Reality' Album.

In The Trenches - With Ryan Roxie 

Debuting on July 16, 2019, "In the Trenches with Ryan Roxie" is a podcast hosted by Roxie. The show features in depth conversations with musicians; the show is billed as featuring "the worlds hardest working musicians...the ones that grind, the ones that commit, the ones who make their dreams come true...in the trenches".

Episode list

Discography

Filmography

References

External links

 

American rock guitarists
American male guitarists
Candy (band) members
Slash's Snakepit members
Alice Cooper (band) members
Living people
1965 births
20th-century American guitarists
American expatriates in Sweden